An air conditioner removes heat and moisture from the interior of an occupied space.

Air conditioner or air Conditioning may also refer to:
 Air Conditioning (album), a 1970 album by Curved Air
 Air Conditioner (film), a 2020 Angolan film

See also
 
 
 AC (disambiguation)